Devil's Bridge is a term applied to dozens of ancient bridges, found primarily in Europe. Most of these bridges are stone or masonry arch bridges and represent a significant technological achievement in ancient architecture. Due to their unusual design, they were an object of fascination and stories in antiquity and medieval Europe.

Each of the Devil's bridges typically has a corresponding Devil-related myth or folktale regarding its origin. These stories vary widely depending on the region and beliefs. Some have the Devil as the builder of the bridge, relating to the precariousness or impossibility of such a bridge to last or exist in the first place, so much so that only the Devil himself could have built it. Others have the knowledge to build such bridges given to mankind as a gift from the Devil as part of a deal, pact or bargain between the Devil and local populace, usually in exchange for their souls.

Associated legends

The bridges that fall into the Devil's Bridge category are so numerous that the legends about them form a special category in the Aarne-Thompson classification system for folktales (Number 1191). Some legends have elements of related folktale categories, for example Deceiving the Devil (AT #1196), The Devil's Contract (AT #756B), and The Master Builder legends.

One version of the tale presents the bridge builder and the Devil as adversaries. This reflects the fact that frequently, such as in the case of the Teufelsbrücke at the St Gotthard Pass, these bridges were built under such challenging conditions that successful completion of the bridge required a heroic effort on the part of the builders and the community, ensuring its legendary status.

Other versions of the legend feature an old lady or a simple herder who makes a pact with the Devil. In this version the devil agrees to build the bridge, and in return he will receive the first soul to cross it. After building the bridge (often overnight) the devil is outwitted by his adversary, for example by throwing bread to lure a dog over the bridge first, and is last seen descending into the water, bringing peace to the community.

In the case of the Steinerne Brücke in Regensburg, the legend speaks of the devil helping in a race between the builders of the bridge and of the cathedral (in fact a significantly later construction), and a slight bump in the middle of the bridge is said to result from the devil's leaping with rage upon being tricked out of his prize.

In the legend of Teufelsbrück in Hamburg, which only leads over a small stream, the carpenter had a pact with the devil, and he promised him the first soul crossing the bridge. On the day of inauguration, while the priest and county councillor debated who should step on the bridge first, a rabbit crossed it and the disappointed devil disappeared. A statue refers to the legend there.

The legend of Ponte della Maddalena in Borgo a Mozzano, Province of Lucca, tells of a local saint, often Saint Julian, the Hospitaller, who made the pact with the devil. On the day of delivery, the saint sets fire to a dog or a pig that crosses the bridge and deceives the devil.

At Sens, a thirteenth century legend tells of an architect who sold his soul to the devil and then subsequently repented. M. le Curé of Sens, drove the devil away with holy water and an exorcism formula beginning with the words Vade retro satana, which he made the penitent repeat. The formula was, at some time, incorporated into the design of the popular Saint Benedict Medal.

Most of the bridges that have received the Devil's Bridge appellation are remarkable in some regard, most often for the technological hurdles surpassed in building the bridge, but on occasion for its aesthetic grace as well, or for its economic or strategic importance to the community it serves.

List of bridges

France

There are 49 Devil's Bridges in France, including:
Pont du Diable – Aniane, Gorges de l'Hérault, Languedoc-Roussillon
Pont du Diable – Villemagne-l'Argentière, Hérault, Languedoc-Roussillon
Pont du Diable – Beaugency
Pont du Diable – Céret
Pont du Diable (Ariège) – near Foix
Pont du Diable – Olargues
Pont du Diable (Pont Valentré) – Cahors
 Pont du Diable – Crouzet Migette
 Pont du Diable – Sens
 Pont du Diable − La Forclaz

Germany

Rakotzbrücke, Azalea and Rhododendron Park Kromlau – Saxony, Germany
Brickegickel – Frankfurt, Germany (similar legend)
Teufelsbrück – Hamburg, Germany
Steinerne Brücke – Regensburg, Germany (similar legend)
Teufelsbrücke – Mannheim, Germany
Teufelsbrücke -- Inzigkofen, Germany

Italy
Ponte del Diavolo – ruins of a Roman bridge along Via Traiana near Montecalvo Irpino, Campania
Ponte del Diavolo – Ascoli Piceno, Marche
Ponte del Diavolo – Blera, Lazio
Ponte del Diavolo (officially Ponte Vecchio, also ) – Bobbio, Emilia Romagna
Ponte del Diavolo or Ponte della Maddalena – Borgo a Mozzano, Tuscany
Ponte del Diavolo – Cavallara (a frazione of Gualdo Cattaneo, Umbria)
 – Cerreto Sannita, Campania
 – Cividale, Friuli
Ponte del Diavolo – Civita, Calabria
Ponte del Diavolo (Su ponti de su tiaulu or Su ponti de is aremigus) – Decimomannu, Sardinia
Ponte del Diavolo (Ponte Vecchio) – Dronero, Province of Cuneo, Piedmont
 – Faicchio, Campania
 – Lanzo Torinese, Piedmont
 – Torcello, Veneto

Portugal
Ponte da Mizarela – Braga District, Portugal

Slovenia
Hudičev most – Bohinj, Slovenia
Hudičev most – Tolmin, Slovenia

Spain
Puente del Diablo – Cueto, Spain
Puente del Diablo – Martorell, Spain
Aqüeducte de les Ferreres – Tarragona, Spain

Switzerland
Pont du Saut de Brot — 
Teufelsbrücke – St Gotthard Pass
 – Hamlet of Egg, municipality of Einsiedeln, canton of Schwyz

United Kingdom

Devil's Bridge (Pontarfynach), Ceredigion, Wales
Devil's Bridge – Kirkby Lonsdale, Cumbria
Devil's Bridge – Horace Farm, Pennington Parish, Cumbria
Devil's Bridge – Weston-super-Mare, North Somerset (1841 bridge over railway)
Devil's Bridge – in the grounds of Weston Park, Staffordshire (18th-century listed bridge in form of grotto)
Devil's Bridge – Pontwalby, Glynneath, Wales
Devil's Bridge – Mossley Hill, Liverpool
Devil's Bridge – Worm's Head, Rhossili, Gower, Wales (a natural arch)

United States 
 Devil's Bridge – Sedona, Arizona, although this is a naturally formed bridge, not a man-made stone bridge

Other countries
 – bypass route around the Severomuysky Tunnel, Buryatia, Russia
Devil's Bridge – Antigua, Caribbean
 – Reka, North Macedonia
Duivelsbrug – Breda, Netherlands
Dyavolski most (Дяволски мост) – near Ardino, Bulgaria
Kuradisild – Tartu, Estonia
Moara Dracului – Câmpulung Moldovenesc, Romania
Puente del Diablo (or Punta del Diablo) – Binangonan, Philippines
Puente La Noria – Buenos Aires, Argentina

See also
 Bridge of Arta 
 Moon bridge – a highly rounded arched pedestrian bridge associated with gardens in China and Japan.

Notes

European folklore
Medieval architecture
Bridges
The Devil in legend